Stephen Siklos (born 1950, died 17 August 2019) was a lecturer in the Faculty of Mathematics at the University of Cambridge. He is known for setting up the Sixth Term Examination Papers, used for undergraduate mathematics admissions at several British universities.

Early life 
Siklos was born in Epsom, Surrey, England in 1950. His father, Theo Siklos, was an educator and his wife, Ruth Siklos, an almoner. He was educated at Collyer's School before reading the Mathematical Tripos at Pembroke College, University of Cambridge, where he graduated with a masters in mathematics and was awarded the Tyson Medal.

Academic career 
In 1973, he began doing research in general relativity under Stephen Hawking, publishing his dissertation titled "Singularities, Invariants and Cosmology" in 1976. From 1980 to 1999 he lectured at Cambridge and was the director of studies at Newnham College. In 1999, he joined Jesus College as a senior tutor, later becoming the college president.

References 

1950 births
2019 deaths
British mathematicians
Alumni of the University of Cambridge
Academics of the University of Cambridge
People from Epsom